"Hooked" is a song recorded by American country music singer Dylan Scott. It was included exclusively on the deluxe edition of his self-titled album on Curb Records. The song was written by Lindsay Rimes, Seth Ennis, and Morgan Evans.

Content
The Boot stated that the song's lyrics "ring true as a country tribute to falling fast and hard into love." Taste of Country noted the song's "soft, smoky introduction", quick progression to the chorus, and "doting aggression" of the lyrics.

Live performances
Scott performed the song on The Today Show on February 5, 2018.

Music video
The music video was directed by Eric Welch and premiered on CMT, GAC and CMT Music in 2017. It was filmed live at a concert at Coyote Joe's in Charlotte, North Carolina.

Chart performance
Having reached a peak of number two  on the Country Airplay chart, the song is now considered one of the slowest climbs to the top 10, finally making it inside the top 10 on its 51st week.  The song has sold 116,000 copies in the United States as of September 2018.

Charts
"Hooked" reached a peak of No. 2 in its 55th week on Country Airplay.

Weekly charts

Year-end charts

Certifications

References

2017 songs
2017 singles
Dylan Scott songs
Song recordings produced by Jim Ed Norman
Songs written by Lindsay Rimes

Curb Records singles